The 1900–01 season was Manchester City F.C.'s tenth season of league football and second season in the First Division of the Football League.

Football League First Division

Results summary

Reports

FA Cup

Squad statistics

Squad
Appearances for competitive matches only

Scorers

All

League

See also
Manchester City F.C. seasons

References

External links
Extensive Manchester City statistics site

1900-01
English football clubs 1900–01 season